Kellogg Glacier is a glacier about  long at the base of Condor Peninsula on the east side of Palmer Land, Antarctica. The glacier flows southeast along the north side of Boyer Spur and merges with the north side of Gruening Glacier just inland from the northwest head of Hilton Inlet. It was mapped by the United States Geological Survey (USGS) in 1974, and was named by the Advisory Committee on Antarctic Names for geologist Karl S. Kellogg, a member of the USGS Lassiter Coast party in 1972–73.

References

Glaciers of Palmer Land